Wirswall is a village and civil parish in the unitary authority of Cheshire East and the ceremonial county of Cheshire, England, located at SJ544441 near the Shropshire border, around 1½ miles north of Whitchurch. The civil parish also includes the settlements of Bradeley Green, Wicksted and part of Willey Moor.

According to the 2001 Census, the parish had a population of 76. At the 2011 Census the population of the civil parish remained less than 100. Details are now included in the civil parish of Marbury cum Quoisley.

History
A large perforated stone axe was found in the village, suggesting occupation during the Neolithic Period.

The village appears in the Domesday Book as Wiresuelle, an outlying estate of Marbury. Like much of the land in the Nantwich hundred it was then held by William Malbank, having been earlier held by Earl Harold. The Domesday Book describes it as being 'waste', suggesting that any settlement might have been destroyed during the suppression of the rebellion of 1069–70. In 1288, it formed part of the barony of Wich Malbank. In 1656, Wirswall (then spelled Wyrsal) was held by the Hinton family.

The population was formerly 103 (1801), 83 (1851), 138 (1901) and 169 (1951).

Geography and transport
The village is surrounded by low hills, which form the highest land in the immediate area. A trig point at 156 m is located to the south east of the village at SJ549438. Nearby villages include Marbury and Wrenbury.

The South Cheshire Way (long-distance footpath) runs through the village, and Bishop Bennet Way (bridleway) terminates there. The Llangollen branch of the Shropshire Union Canal runs ¾ miles to its east.

Landmarks

Wicksted Hall is a brick and timbered building with a stone portal, dating from the late 19th century. Wirswall Hall has a grade-II-listed timber-framed barn dating from the 16th or 17th century. There are also two grade-II-listed farmhouses. Grange Farm has a two-storey, four-bay farmhouse with a projecting gabled bay. The building is dated 1636 and has a timber frame with brick infill. Wood Farm has a two-storey Gothic-style farmhouse in rendered brick which dates from the early 19th century. The slightly projecting central bay of the main building bears a shield and is flanked with two octagonal turrets capped with pinnacles.

Notable people
The Victorian children's book illustrator Randolph Caldecott lived in Wirswall between 1861 and 1867, while working at the Whitchurch branch of the Whitchurch & Ellesmere Bank, and many of his illustrations feature local landscapes.

See also

Listed buildings in Wirswall

References

External links

Villages in Cheshire
Civil parishes in Cheshire